Missions of Love is a Japanese manga series written by Ema Tōyama. Missions of Love was first serialized in the monthly Shōjo magazine Nakayoshi in June 2009 and in the quarterly magazine counterpart Nakayoshi Lovely from December 17, 2009 to March 17, 2010. In all, nineteen volumes were released in Japan. On April 23, 2012, it was announced that Kodansha USA had licensed the series for release in North America. The first volume was released on November 6, 2012 and the last on December 10, 2019. Missions of Love has received mixed to positive ratings with volume's 2 and 4 being on the New York Times best seller list for manga. The manga is about a girl named Yukina who is a cell phone novelist who has been struggling with ideas for her novel. Yukina is described as the "absolute zero snow woman" as she does not appear to be warm to people around her. Things get better for her novels when Yukina finds out the most popular boy in school Shigure has a secret. In order to keep it a secret, Shigure is asked by Yukina to do Missions for her that involve romance to better her novel writing as she intends to complete a love story. As the story progresses Yukina begins to question if the feelings are of true love or not. Things get more complicated when Yukina's cousin also states he has feelings for her, in addition Shigure's childhood friend also has intentions of her own.

Volume list

References

External links
Official manga website 
 

Missions of Love